Daut Haradinaj (born 6 April 1978) is a Kosovo Albanian politician, the brother of Ramush Haradinaj, and former Kosovo Liberation Army (KLA) member during the Kosovo War (1998–99). He was part of the leadership in the Kosovo Protection Corps.

Haradinaj was born on 6 April 1978, as one of nine children, in the village of Glođane, near Dečani, in the Kosovo province that was part of the Socialist Republic of Serbia and Socialist Federal Republic of Yugoslavia. His paternal descent is from Berishë in northern Albania, around the city of Pukë.

Criminal charges 
In December 2002 Haradinaj was sentenced to five years of prison with five other members of the KLA by a UN court in Kosovo for his involvement in the kidnapping and murder of four members of the Armed Forces of the Republic of Kosovo (FARK) and the Democratic League of Kosovo (LDK).

References

Further reading

External links

1978 births
Albanian nationalists in Kosovo
Alliance for the Future of Kosovo politicians
Living people
Kosovo Albanians
Kosovo Liberation Army soldiers
People acquitted by the International Criminal Tribunal for the former Yugoslavia
People from Deçan
2001 insurgency in Macedonia